Znamensk is a closed town in Astrakhan Oblast, Russia. Population:

History
It was founded in 1948 as Kapustin Yar-1 to serve a missile test range known as Kapustin Yar. Kasputin Yar-1 was granted town status in 1962. The closed town was renamed Znamensk in 1992. 

The military testing range is officially known as 4GCMP (4th State Central Interspecific Test-site). Kapustin Yar is also the name of a nearby village.

Administrative and municipal status
Within the framework of administrative divisions, it is incorporated as the closed administrative-territorial formation of Znamensk—an administrative unit with the status equal to that of the districts. As a municipal division, the closed administrative-territorial formation of Znamensk is incorporated as Znamensk Urban Okrug.

Education
The town has twenty-one kindergartens, four middle schools, two gymnasium schools, a sports facility, and a branch of the Astrakhan State Institute.

Transportation
Railway station "Razyezd 85 km" on the Volgograd-Astrakhan railway branch is located in the town.
Kapustin Yar (air base) is near the town.

References

Notes

Sources

External links

Official website of Znamensk 
Znamensk Business Directory 

Cities and towns in Astrakhan Oblast
Naukograds